Arthur Lungu (born 13 April 1976) is a retired Zambian football midfielder. He was a squad member at the 2000 African Cup of Nations.

References

1976 births
Living people
Zambian footballers
Zambia international footballers
Zamsure F.C. players
Al-Taawoun FC players
Saudi Professional League players
Association football midfielders
2000 African Cup of Nations players
Expatriate footballers in Saudi Arabia
Zambian expatriate sportspeople in Saudi Arabia